USS LST-29 was a United States Navy  used exclusively in the Asiatic-Pacific Theater during World War II. Like many of her class, she was not named and is properly referred to by her hull designation.

Construction
LST-29 was laid down on 8 January 1943, at Pittsburgh, Pennsylvania, by the Dravo Corporation; launched on 17 May 1943; sponsored by Mrs. C. F. Lockton; and commissioned on 10 July 1943.

Service history
During World War II, LST-29 was assigned to the Asiatic-Pacific theater and participated in the following operations: the Gilbert Islands operation during the battle of Tarawa in November and December 1943; the Marshall Islands operation during the occupation of Kwajalein and Majuro Atolls in January and February 1944, and the occupation of Eniwetok Atoll in February March 1944; the Marianas operation during the capture and occupation of Guam in July and August 1944; and the assault and occupation of Okinawa Gunto in May 1945.

Postwar career
LST-29 was decommissioned on 11 March 1946, and was struck from the Navy list on 8 May 1946. On 17 June 1946, she was sold to the Foss Launch & Tug Company, of Seattle, Washington.

Awards
LST-29 earned four battle stars for her World War II service.

References

Bibliography

External links

 

LST-1-class tank landing ships of the United States Navy
World War II amphibious warfare vessels of the United States
Ships built in Pittsburgh
1943 ships
Ships built by Dravo Corporation